Die Freundschaft (Friendship) was a German Weimar-era gay magazine that was published from 1919 to 1933.

History
Die Freundschaft was founded by Karl Schultz on 13 August 1919, and was alternatively subtitled "Mitteilungsblatt des Klubs der Freunde und Freundinnen" ("News bulletin of the Club of [male] friends and [female] friends") or "Monatsschrift für den Befreiungskampf andersveranlagter Männer und Frauen" ("Monthly magazine for the liberation of men and women of different disposition"). It became the first gay publication to be sold openly at newsstands. It was edited by Max Danielsen until 1922, when he was replaced by Georg Plock. Rudolph Ihne was also involved in overseeing the magazine's publication. In 1922, two competing gay publications were merged into Die Freundschaft: Adolf Brand's Freundschaft und Freiheit (Friendship and Freedom) and René Stelter's Uranos.

Die Freundschaft offices were located in Berlin's . It was originally published weekly for the organisation Deutscher Freundschaftsverband (DFV), which became in 1923 Bund für Menschenrecht, but was later slowed to a monthly and then a semi-annual publication. Although each issue cost 50 pfennigs, which was relatively expensive, the magazine regularly sold out on its first day of publication in major German cities.

Most of Die Freundschaft authors wrote under pseudonyms initially, but after a debate which concluded that the use of pseudonyms was counterproductive to the gay rights movement, most writers used their true names. Contributors wrote about the history of homosexuality and argued for its decriminalisation. They mostly approached the topics of homosexuality and gender variance from a spiritual rather than a science-based perspective, and considered how these topics could fit into existing religions. The magazine strongly promoted the ideas of reincarnation and karma. It also contained personal advertisements, photographs, and illustrations.

In 1928 the magazine was forced to dramatically change its format to avoid censorship, and in 1933 it was forced to cease publication by Nazi authorities.

References

External links

1919 establishments in Germany
1933 disestablishments in Germany
1910s LGBT-related mass media
Defunct magazines published in Germany
German-language magazines
LGBT-related magazines published in Germany
Magazines disestablished in 1933
Magazines established in 1919
Magazines published in Berlin
First homosexual movement
1920s LGBT-related mass media
1930s LGBT-related mass media